Seymore D. Fair (a.k.a. Seymour D. Fair, and sometimes called Seymore de Faire or Seymour d'Fair) is a cartoon animal and costumed character who was the official mascot of the 1984 Louisiana World Exposition. An anthropomorphic white pelican, Seymore typically wears a blue tuxedo jacket, large top hat, spats, and white gloves. His name is derived from the New Orleans "Yat" phrase "See more of the fair".  Seymore was the "world's 1st-ever" character mascot in the history of World Expositions.

Seymore promoted the New Orleans World's Fair globally, including in Los Angeles, New York, Paris, and London. During the 1984 Republican National Convention, he interacted on stage with George H. W. Bush, Vice-President of the United States and numerous Chiefs of State. In Washington, D.C., he hung out with Billy Joel at the White House entertaining wives of Russian diplomats.  Seymore appeared on Saturday Night Live, shown guarding an entrance to the White House with Secret Service agents.

Name

For the first 10 months of his existence, Seymore was simply referred to as Mr. Pelican. Later, fair management worked with a local convenience store chain to create a naming contest, which resulted in over 18,000 name submissions. Judges included local celebrities such as Angus Lind and Bob Marshall of the States Item.  Other submitted names included Crazy-Laid-Back Fred, Puddin Pus, and Valdimir. 

The winner of the contest was Susan Shambra, a computer operator for a local insurance company. Seymore's name, is a derivative of the local Yat dialect translation of "See More of the Fair"' as "Seymore D' Fair."

Advocacy and education
In addition to his job at the New Orleans World's Fair, Seymore engaged in numerous educational, civic, and community causes, most notably Substance Free Lifestyles, Animal Welfare, and Positive Behavior programs.  In 1986 he and his Critter friends performed with First Lady Nancy Reagan in the national "Just Say No" Rally held in the Louisiana Superdome.

Inspired by the First Lady's anti-drug campaign, Seymore & the Critters joined forces with local law enforcement agencies in 1986 to produce a drug education program titled "Critters & Kids Just Say NO to Drugs". The  two-part program consisted of a 45-minute live theater presentation and a post program classroom teaching unit. Approximately 100 public, private, and parochial schools from the metro New Orleans area participated with 40,000 K-6 students attended the live theater presentation. At that time, Harry Lee Jefferson Parish Sheriff proclaimed that the Critters & Kids Just Say No program was the largest singular drug education effort in Louisiana history.

Honors & awards
At the close of the fair in November 1984, Seymore was enshrined alongside Dorothy's ruby slippers in the Smithsonian Institution.  He was also inducted into the New Orleans Historic Collection and the Louisiana State Archives where he is prominently displayed. Seymore and his friends known as the "Critters" were appointed "Ambassadors of Goodwill" for the State of Louisiana by then Governor Edwin E. Edwards. New Orleans Mayor Ernest "Dutch" Morial issued a proclamation in 1986 proclaiming January 24 as "Seymore D' Fair" day.

The Seymore D. Fair Foundation
To foster and support Seymore's community programs, the Seymore D. Fair Foundation was established in 2015.  The foundation is a registered 501(3)c organization that supports the advancement of children's education efforts throughout the world.

A national nonprofit advocacy organization for children the Seymore D. Fair Foundation is dedicated to promoting the empowerment of people, the welfare of animals, and protection of the planet. The foundation focuses its support on committed grassroots educational efforts and organizations that rely on programs and volunteer efforts where foundation support will make a significant difference.

See also
 1984 Louisiana World Exposition
 Bureau of International Expositions
 Twipsy, mascot for the 2000 Hannover World Exposition
 Haibao, mascot for the 2010 Shanghai World Exposition

References

External links
 The Seymore D' Fair Foundation
 ExpoMuseum's 1984 Louisiana World Exposition Section
 Exposición Internacional 1984 Nueva Orleans
 WorldCat | OCLC 11349788 | by Jim Machin | Color the Fair with Seymore  

Fictional pelicans
American mascots
Bird mascots
Cartoon mascots
Male characters in advertising
Public service announcement characters
Mascots introduced in 1984
Fictional characters from Louisiana
World's Fair mascots
1984 Louisiana World Exposition